This list of tallest buildings in Abu Dhabi ranks skyscrapers in Abu Dhabi, United Arab Emirates by height.

Tallest buildings

The list ranks Abu Dhabi skyscrapers based on standard height measurement. This includes architectural details and spires, but does not include antenna masts. Although not falling into the category of buildings, Abu Dhabi also claimed the world record for the highest free-standing flagpole in the world between 2001 and 2003.

Timeline of tallest building

See also
 List of tallest buildings in Asia
 List of tallest buildings in the United Arab Emirates

References

External links
 Overview of Abu Dhabi Buildings - images at e-architect.org
 Diagram of Abu Dhabi skyscrapers on SkyscraperPage.com

Tallest buildings
Abu Dhabi
Tallest, Abu Dhabi